Amata leucosoma is a moth of the subfamily Arctiinae. It was described by Arthur Gardiner Butler in 1876. It is found in Kashmir.

References

leucosoma
Moths of Asia